Eskdale is a locality in the Somerset Region, Queensland, Australia.

History 
In 1877,  were resumed from the Eskdale pastoral run and offered for selection on 24 April 1877.

References 

Suburbs of Somerset Region
Localities in Queensland